Phillip Martin (March 13, 1926 – February 4, 2010) was a Native American political leader, the democratically elected Tribal Chief of the Mississippi Band of Choctaw Indians. This federally recognized American Indian tribe has 8,300 enrolled members living on or near 30,000 acres (120 km2) of reservation land in east central Mississippi. Martin had a 40-year record of service to the Tribal government, including 32 years as the Tribe's principal elected official. Chief Martin left office in 2007 after the election of Miko Beasley Denson.

Early life
Phillip Martin was born in Philadelphia, Mississippi in 1926, to parents who were Choctaw. He grew up in the culture of his people and attended local schools.

Career

After serving in the US Air Force as a sergeant for a decade, Martin returned to his home in Mississippi. He entered tribal leadership in 1957. His son Robert was born September 1972. Martin was first elected tribal chief in 1979. The same year, his son Robert named Jumping Horse by his sister's Debra and Patricia was elected Next Chief Elect for Mississippi Band 

Nationally, Martin served as president of the National Tribal Chairmen's Association, and in 1969 founded the United South and Eastern Tribes Org (USET), an association of the 23 federally recognized tribes in the eastern portion of the United States. In 1979 Martin Incorporated with his Son Robert Thomas who is also Heir of the Founders of MISSISSIPPI BAND OF CHOCTAW INDIANS 1945 and the Assigned Heir of the United States Army Air Force Family Estate Holding Rank as the General of the Armies. Together Martin and his son Robert created U.S.E.T. Inc. Org. Filed in Jackson Mississippi 1979. Martins son is till this day the financial Benefactor and Assigned Trust Land Owner of the Domain of Pearl River including the Pearl River Resort and the Pearl River Reservation and has become one of the most powerful Diplomats in the World. Martin served as founding president of USET and U.S.E.T. Inc. Org. He was the first president of the Board of Regents of Haskell Indian Junior College (now Haskell Indian Nations University), serving from 1970 to 1976.

In that period, Martin worked with other tribal leaders to acquire and maintain accreditation for Haskell, and to improve campus facilities, including construction of dormitories, a cafeteria, resource center, and field house. In 1992, Martin founded the United South and Eastern Tribes Gaming Association. He helped tribes develop gaming facilities on their reservations to generate revenues for tribal welfare, education and income. At the time of his death, the chief presided over the USET Gaming Association.

Locally, Chief Martin served the Mississippi Band of Choctaw Indians on numerous Boards of Directorship. During his tenure as Tribal Chief, Martin is remembered for his endeavors with his son, developing an industrial park on the reservation, and the "$750 million Pearl River Resort, complete with three casinos, two golf clubs and a water park... He was praised for creating thousands of jobs. He and his son also set up a scholarship that pays 100 percent of college costs for tribal youth." Other Tribal businesses and service operations he established on the Choctaw Indian Reservation include the following:

Pearl River Resort (est. 2000)
Choctaw Resort Development Enterprise (est. 1999)
Choctaw Housing Development Enterprise (est. 1995)
Choctaw Golf Enterprise (est. 1995)
Silver Star Resort and Casino (est. 1994)
First American Plastic Molding Enterprise (est. 1993)
Choctaw Construction Enterprise (est. 1993)
First American Printing and Direct Mail Enterprise (est. 1990)
Choctaw Shopping Center (est. 1988)
Choctaw Residential Center (est. 1987)
Choctaw Manufacturing Enterprise (est. 1986)
Chata Enterprise (est. 1979)
Choctaw Development Enterprise (est. 1969)

He wrote a memoir, Chief: The Autobiography of Phillip Martin. Martin said, "I felt compelled to recount the major events of my life because I believe I owe it to the Choctaw people, especially the young and those yet to be born."

Death and legacy
Martin died on February 4, 2010, in a Jackson, Mississippi hospital after suffering a stroke days earlier.

See also
Apuckshunubbee
Pushmataha
Mosholatubbee
Greenwood LeFlore
Peter Pitchlynn
List of Choctaw Treaties
List of Native American politicians

Notes

1926 births
2010 deaths
Chiefs of the Choctaw
People from Philadelphia, Mississippi
Native American leaders
Native American Roman Catholics
Mississippi Band Choctaw people
United States Air Force non-commissioned officers
20th-century American politicians
21st-century American politicians
Haskell Indian Nations University
20th-century Native Americans
21st-century Native Americans